Velikanov (from великан meaning giant) is a Russian masculine surname, its feminine counterpart is Velikanova. It may refer to
Gelena Velikanova (1923–1998), Soviet pop singer
Mikhail Velikanov (1892–1938), Soviet military commander
Tatyana Velikanova (1932–2002), Russian mathematician

Russian-language surnames